= Manatí Sugar Company =

American-owned sugar company in Cuba

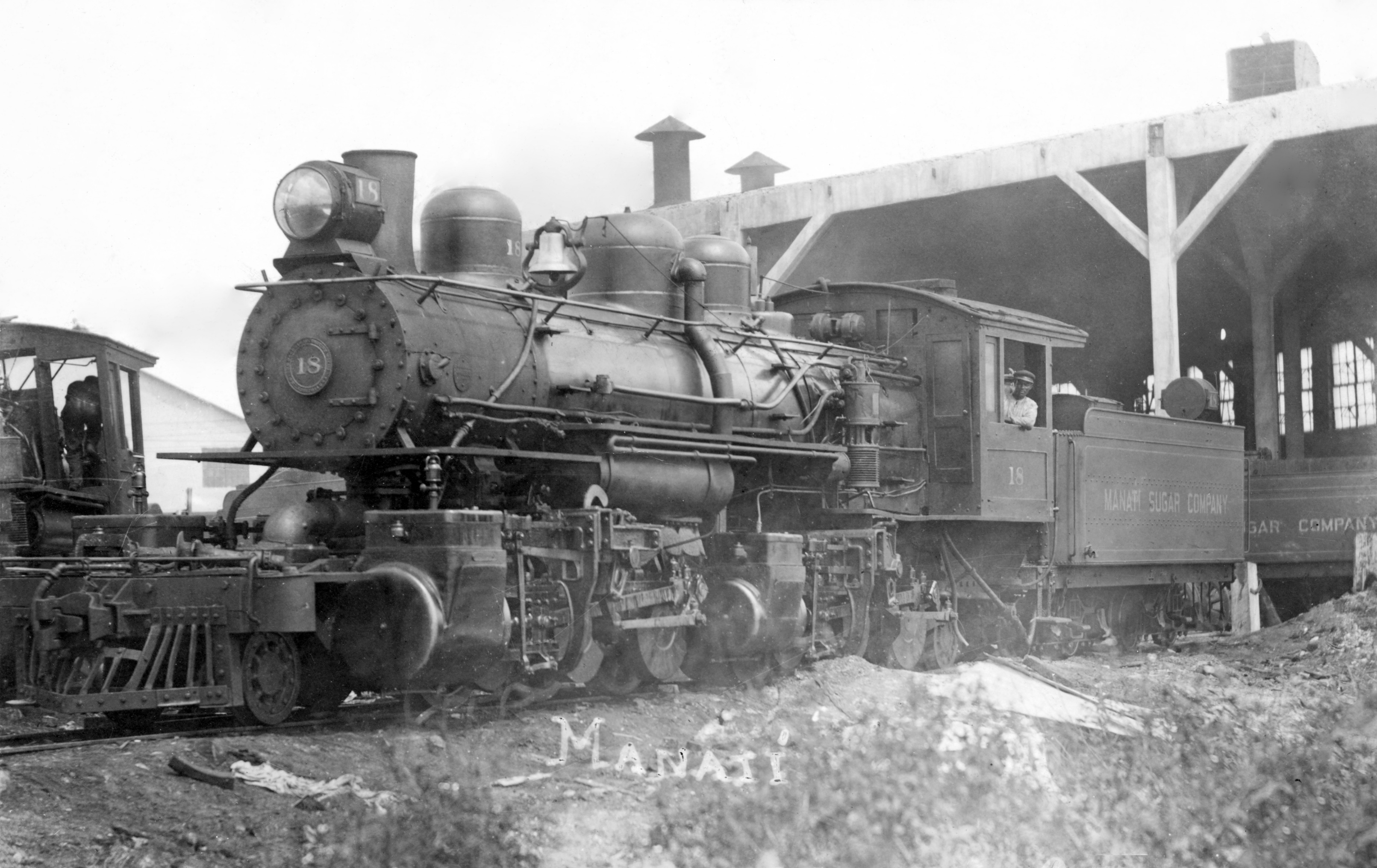
Train for the Manatí Sugar Company, 1921

The Manatí Sugar Company was an American-owned sugar company in Cuba.
